Phoenicocoris obscurellus is a species of plant bugs belonging to the family Miridae, subfamily Phylinae that is found throughout continental Europe and the British Isles, except for southeastern Europe.

References

Insects described in 1829
Hemiptera of Europe
Miridae